Radina is a surname and a feminine given name. Notable with the name are given as follows:

Surname
 Anastasiya Radina (born 1984), Ukrainian politician
 Natalya Radina (born 1979), Belarusian journalist

Given name
 Radina Borshosh (born 1997), Bulgarian actress
 Radina Tomova (born 2005), Bulgarian rhythmic gymnast

Bulgarian feminine given names